Jeanne Roques (23 February 1889 – 11 December 1957), known professionally as Musidora, was a French actress, film director, and writer. She is best known for her acting in silent films, and rose to public attention for roles in the Louis Feuillade serials Les Vampires as Irma Vep and in Judex as Marie Verdier.

Early life
Born Jeanne Roques in Paris, France to music composer and theorist of socialism Jacques Roques and painter and feminist Adèle Clémence Porchez, Musidora began her career in the arts at an early age, writing her first novel at the age of fifteen and acting on the stage with the likes of Colette, one of her lifelong friends.  During the very early years of French cinema Musidora began a professional collaboration with the highly successful French film director Louis Feuillade. She made her film debut in Les miseres de l'aiguille, directed by Raphael Clamour, in January 1914. The film highlights the problems of the urban women in the French working-class, and presents a new representation of the female even by the working-class movement in the early 20th century in France.

Adopting the moniker of Musidora (Greek for "gift of the muses"), after the heroine in Théophile Gautier's novel Fortunio, and affecting a unique vamp persona that would be popularized in the United States by actress Theda Bara at about the same time, Musidora soon found a foothold in the nascent medium of moving pictures. With her heavily kohled dark eyes, somewhat sinister make-up, pale skin and exotic wardrobes, Musidora quickly became a highly popular and instantly recognizable presence of European cinema.

Stardom

Beginning in 1915, Musidora began appearing in the successful Feuillade-directed serial Les Vampires as Irma Vep (an anagram of "vampire"), a cabaret singer, opposite Édouard Mathé as crusading journalist Philippe Guerande. Contrary to the title, Les Vampires was not actually about vampires, but about a criminal-gang-run-secret-society inspired by the exploits of the real-life Bonnot Gang. Vep, besides playing a leading role in the Vampires' crimes, also spends two episodes under the hypnotic control of Moreno, a rival criminal who makes her his lover and induces her to assassinate the Grand Vampire.

The series was an immediate success with French cinema-goers and ran in 10 installments until 1916. After the Les Vampires serial, Musidora starred as adventuress, Diana Monti (aka governess "Marie Verdier") in Judex, another popular Feuillade serial filmed in 1916 but delayed for release until 1917. Though not intended to be avant-garde, Les Vampires and Judex were lauded by Louis Aragon and Andre Breton in the 1920s for the films' elements of surprise, fantasy/science fiction, unexpected juxtapositions and visual non sequiturs. Filmmakers Fritz Lang, Luis Buñuel, Georges Franju, Alain Resnais, and Olivier Assayas have cited Les Vampires and Judex as influencing them in their desires to become directors.

Other works
At a time when many women in the film industry were relegated to acting, Musidora achieved a degree of success as a producer and director. Musidora became a film producer and director under the tutelage of her mentor, Louis Feuillade. Between the late 1910s and early 1920s, she directed ten films, all of which are lost with the exception of two: 1922's Soleil et Ombre and 1924's La Terre des Taureaux, both of which were filmed in Spain. In Italy, she produced and directed La Flamme Cachee based on the work of her friend Colette. In the same year, she co-wrote (with Colette) and co-directed (with Eugenio Perego) La vagabonda based on Colette's novel of the same name.

Later life

After her career as an actress faded, she focused on writing and producing. Her last film was an homage to her mentor Feuillade titled La Magique Image in 1950, which she both directed and starred in. Late in her life, she would occasionally work in the ticket booth of the Cinémathèque Française—few patrons realized that the older woman in the foyer might be starring in the film they were watching.

Musidora died in Paris, France in 1957 and was buried in the Cimetière de Bois-le-Roi.

Personal life
Musidora married Dr. Clément Marot on 20 April 1927. The union lasted 15 years and produced one child, Clément Marot Jr. (1928–2010). The couple divorced in 1944.

Selected filmography

 Les misères de l'aiguille (1914)
 Severo Torelli (1914)
 The Vampires (1915)
 Judex (1916)
 The Jackals (1917)
 The Vagabond (1918)
 Mademoiselle Chiffon (1919)
 Pour don Carlos (1920) Written, co-directed, and co-starring Musidora.
 Vincenta (1920) Written, directed, and starring Musidora in the title role.
 Sol y sombra (1922) Co-written, co-directed, and co-starring Musidora.
 Le berceau de dieu (1926)

Works

 Musidora,  “Vicenta.” Comoedia illustré (15 February 1920): 207-208.
 Musidora,  “Comment j’ai tourné Don Carlos.” Ève (30 January 1921): 10.
 Musidora-Pierre Louÿs : une amitié amoureuse : récit et correspondances, 1914-1924 
 Musidora,  “Grandes Enquètes d’Ève: Comment je suis devenue Torera.” Ève (28 September 1924): 11-18.
 Musidora,  “En Amour tout est possible.” Paris: Éditions Eugène Figuière, 1928. 
 Musidora,  “Arlequin et Anabella, roman.”, 1928. 
 Musidora,  “Paroxysmes. De l’amour à la mort.” Paris: Éditions Eugène Figuière, 1934.
 Musidora,  “Auréoles : poésies scandées.” Paris: Éditions Arnaud, 1939. (Préface de Wilfrid Lucas.) 
 Musidora,  “La Vie d’une vamp”, Ciné-Mondial 42-48 (12 June – 17 July 1942): n.p.
 Musidora,  “La vie sentimentale de George Sand.” Paris: Éditions de la Revue moderne, 1946. 
 Musidora,  Souvenirs sur Pierre Louÿs. Muizon: Éditions “À L’écart,” 1984.
 Musidora,  Interview with Renée Sylvaire. Manuscript. Committee on Historical Research Collection (Fonds Commission des Recherches Historiques), CHR29-B1. Bibliothèque du Film, Cinémathèque Française.
 Musidora,  “Colette et le Cinéma Muet.” In Patrick Cazals, Musidora. La dixième muse. Paris: Éditions Henry Veryier, 1978. 195-199.

Further reading

Patrick Cazals, (2020) Musidora-Pierre Louÿs: Une amitié amoureuse, Paris: Éditions du Horla.
 
 Colette (2014) Un Bien Grand Amour: Lettres À Musidora 1908-1953 - L'Herne
 
 
 
 
 
 
 
 
 Lacassin, Francis (November 1970) Musidora, Anthologie du cinéma, supplément à L'Avant-Scène du Cinéma n° 108, 
 
 
 
 
 
 
 
 
 
Cahiers Musidora

References

External links

 
  TV Documentary Movie
 Musidora at the Women Film Pioneers Project
 Musidora 1889-1957 - Encyclopedia.com
 
 Musidora - Calindex
 Musidora Fonds La Cinémathèque française

1889 births
1957 deaths
20th-century French actresses
Actresses from Paris
Burials at Montmartre Cemetery
French women film directors
Film directors from Paris
French film actresses
French silent film actresses
French stage actresses
Women film pioneers